The Navy is a 1930 short animated film produced by Walter Lantz and as part of the Oswald the Lucky Rabbit cartoons.

Plot summary
Oswald is a sailor who works on the ship of the admiral, and is wearing shoes for the first time. One day when work is done for the day, he looks forward to find a date at a lighthouse.

Minutes afterward, Oswald arrives at the lighthouse. To get the attention of his special someone, Oswald sings while a couple of sparrows play an accordion. Looking out the window of the lighthouse is a girl cat who is entertained by Oswald's performance. To get inside, Oswald springs himself upward using the accordion. Oswald then notices that the girl cat is having an affair with the admiral who orders him to return to the ship.

Back in the vessel, Oswald is assigned to scrub the ship's main floor and polish the cannons. To make his jobs more interesting, he comes up with an eccentric method by riding behind two runaway tabbies and at the same time scrub the floor with brushes attached to his feet as he gets pulled. This strategy turned out to be very difficult to control as it results in Oswald accidentally stripping paint off some life boats as well as knocking down the admiral.

The admiral is most dissatisfied and literally kicks Oswald out of the ship. The kick is so powerful that Oswald is sent airborne for a few miles. The rabbit ends up landing in knickers that are hanged on a clothesline. At the end of the clothesline lies the window of the lighthouse which is right next to Oswald. Once more the girl cat shows up and is happy to see Oswald again. The two trade kisses.

See also
Oswald the Lucky Rabbit filmography

References

External links
The Navy at the Big Cartoon Database
 

1930 films
1930 animated films
1930s American animated films
1930s animated short films
American black-and-white films
Films directed by Walter Lantz
Oswald the Lucky Rabbit cartoons
Universal Pictures animated short films
Walter Lantz Productions shorts
Animated films about cats